John Thorold Masefield, CMG (born 1 October 1939) is a British retired diplomat.

From 1994 to 1997, he served as High Commissioner of the United Kingdom to Nigeria and from 1989 to 1992, he served as High Commissioner of the United Kingdom to Tanzania. Masefield served as Governor of Bermuda from 4 June 1997 to 17 November 2001. During his tenure, he oversaw the banning of McDonald's and other fast food restaurants from the island.

References

1939 births
Living people
Members of HM Diplomatic Service
Companions of the Order of St Michael and St George
People educated at The Dragon School
Alumni of St John's College, Cambridge
Civil servants in the Commonwealth Relations Office
Governors of Bermuda
High Commissioners of the United Kingdom to Nigeria
High Commissioners of the United Kingdom to Tanzania
Ambassadors of the United Kingdom to Benin
Ambassadors of the United Kingdom to Chad
20th-century British diplomats